William James Clench (24 October 1897 – 22 February 1984) was an American malacologist, professor at Harvard University and curator of the mollusk collection in the malacology department of the Museum of Comparative Zoology at Harvard.

Early life
Clench was born in Brooklyn, but was largely raised in Massachusetts. In 1913 he entered the Huntington School in Boston. While there he often engaged in bug collecting, and would show his collections to Charles Willison Johnson at the Boston Society of Natural History. Johnson introduced Clench to such men as William F. Clapp, who was the curator of mollusks at the Museum of Comparative Zoology (MCZ).

Education
Clench received his undergraduate education at Michigan State College (now Michigan State University), graduating in 1921. He spent the summer studying mollusks on Sanibel Island and then began study at Harvard under William Morton Wheeler. He received his master's degree in entomology in 1923. He then went on to pursue his PhD at the University of Michigan, in Ann Arbor, in mollusk study, with a Hinsdale Fellowship.

Personal life
In 1924 Clench married Julia Helmich, a resident of East Lansing, Michigan whom he had met while attending Michigan Agricultural College. Their eldest son, Harry Kendon Clench (1925–1979), would become a well-known lepidopterist at the Carnegie Museum of Natural History in Pittsburgh.

Career
Clench left Ann Arbor in 1925, to take a position at the Kent Scientific Museum. In 1926 he joined the Museum of Comparative Zoology, where he remained until 1966. He did not actually finish work on his PhD until 1953. Much of Clench's work was done with Ruth D. Turner. Jointly they introduced about 70 new taxa, and the two of them (together and independently) introduced a total of approximately 500 new taxa.

Species named in honor of Clench
A species of lizard, Sphaerodactylus clenchi, is named in honor of William J. Clench.

Bibliography
Clench published over 400 scientific papers, and was the founding editor of Johnsonia. He also served as the third president of the American Malacological Union.

Clench WJ (1966). "Pomacea bridgesi (Reeve) in Florida". The Nautilus 79: 105. – This report was in fact Pomacea diffusa.
Clench WJ (1968). "Notes on species of Urocoptis described by George C. Spence". Proceedings of the Malacological Society of London 38: 101–102. abstract.

References

Sources
Abbott RT (1984). "A Farewell to Bill Clench". The Nautilus 98 (2): 55–58.

External links
Biography of William Clench
Bibliography of taxa introduced by Clench or Turner

1897 births
Michigan State University alumni
Harvard University alumni
American malacologists
University of Michigan alumni
Harvard University faculty
1984 deaths
20th-century American zoologists